Valeri Vasilyevich Kopiy (born 20 February 1948) is a retired Soviet football player.

Honours
 Soviet Top League winner: 1972.

International career
Kopiy played his only game for USSR on 29 June 1972 in a friendly against Uruguay.

External links
  Profile

1948 births
Living people
Russian footballers
Soviet footballers
Soviet Union international footballers
FC Zenit Saint Petersburg players
Pakhtakor Tashkent FK players
FC Zorya Luhansk players
Soviet Top League players
Association football midfielders
FC Dynamo Saint Petersburg players